Malappuram Haji Mahanaya Joji is a 1994 Indian Malayalam-language comedy film screen play and directed by Thulasidas and dialogues by Rajan Kiriyath and Vinu Kiriyath from a story by Babu G. Nair. The film stars Mukesh, Siddique, Madhu, Jagathy Sreekumar, and Maathu. The music for the film was composed by Johnson. The film was remade in Tamil as Raman Abdullah (1997) and in Telugu as Golmaal (2003). The scene where Jagathy Sreekumar's character was shot was shown in Poove Unakkaga (1996) with R. S. Shivaji's character getting stabbed.

Plot

Kunjalikutty, who is a Muslim gets both a visa to Dubai and a job offer at a school managed by his father's friend, Malappuram Hajiyar in Malappuram at the same time. His father refuses to let him go to Dubai and wants him to take the teaching job. So Kunjalikutty sends his friend Joji a handsome and well-educated Hindu, in his place to the school, and goes to Dubai without his parents knowledge.

Malappuram Hajiyar is a bold and religious man having a huge public appeal, with no tolerance towards deception. Thus people approach him with awe. Hajiyar's code of conduct scares Joji to the core that he has to conceal his own identity while living as Kunjalikkutty's impostor. A hilariously hostile relationship develops between Joji and Aliyar, who is the physical education teacher, and later, Joji's roommate. Joji soon gets into the good books of Hajiyar, while Aliyar remains stuck in the rut of being too slack for a teacher, for instance, coming late for the school.

Things do not go easy for Joji. He nearly blew his cover at times, which triggers Aliyar's suspicion. On one such occasion, he is accidentally confronted by Gouri, who hails from a reputed Hindu family, when he goes to the temple and is caught by her and the priest. The story enters a serious turn, when Kunjalikutty shows up, telling Joji that he has become a victim of a visa scam run by Jafer Khan, who now targets Kunjalikutty for extermination.

Unable to face his own strict father, while avoiding Jafer Khan's goons, Kunjalikutty decides to stay with Joji, as Joji. Thus Kunjalikutty and Joji lives together with Aliyar, under swapped identities. Aliyar, who cannot stand Joji further, becomes desperate to get into the bottom of things.

Cast

Soundtrack
Music: Johnson; Lyrics: Bichu Thirumala
"Maanam Mutte" M. G. Sreekumar, Sujatha, C. O. Anto
"Penkiliye" G. Venugopal, K. S. Chithra

References

External links
 
 Malappuram Haji Mahanaya Joji at the Malayalam Movie Database

1990s Malayalam-language films
1994 films
1994 comedy films
Indian comedy films
Films directed by Thulasidas
Films set in Dubai
Malayalam films remade in other languages